Henry Joseph Barnes (19 April 1903 – 27 June 2001) was an Australian rules footballer who played with North Melbourne in the Victorian Football League (VFL).

Notes

External links 

1903 births
2001 deaths
Australian rules footballers from Victoria (Australia)
North Melbourne Football Club players